The Río Negro Municipality is one of the seven municipalities (municipios) that makes up the southern Venezuelan state of Amazonas and, according to the 2011 census by the National Institute of Statistics of Venezuela, the municipality has a population of 2,300. The town of San Carlos de Río Negro is the shire town of the Río Negro Municipality.

History

The town of San Carlos de Río Negro was founded in 1759 around a mounted camp by the expedition captained by José Solano that moved to that area in the extent of the works of exploration of the limits between the Crowns of Portugal and Spain requested by the Treaty of Madrid.  José Solano set up his exploration base in that place, in the margins of the Rio Negro, and there he settled with the few men that had survived the ascent along the Orinoco River, since most, including the famous Swedish botanist Pehr Löfling that accompanied the expedition, they had succumbed prey of the tropical diseases, especially the yellow fever.

San Carlos de Río Negro was visited from May 7 to May 10, 1800, for the expedition of Alexander von Humboldt and Aimé Bonpland, constituting the most southern point of their (périplo) for the Amazon Basin.

Demographics
The Río Negro Municipality, according to a 2007 population estimate by the National Institute of Statistics of Venezuela, has a population of 2,660 (up from 2,314 in 2000). This amounts to 1.9% of the state's population.

Government
The mayor of the Río Negro Municipality is Luis Alirio Avaristo, elected on October 31, 2004, with 37% of the vote.  Avaristo had been serving as the acting mayor of the Río Negro Municipality since August 13, 2002, following the resignation of Pedro Zerpa.  The municipality is divided into four parishes; Capital Río Negro, Solano, Casiquiare, and Cocuy (previous to December 18, 1997, the Río Negro Municipality contained only a single parish).

See also
San Carlos de Río Negro
Amazonas
Municipalities of Venezuela

References

External links
rionegro-amazonas.gob.ve 
San Carlos de Río Negro 

Municipalities of Amazonas (Venezuelan state)